The 1996 Portuguese presidential election was held on 14 January.

Incumbent president Mário Soares was constitutionally barred from a third consecutive term. 
The Social Democrats were coming from a clear defeat in 1995 Portuguese legislative election, and their former leader, Aníbal Cavaco Silva, who had left the office of Prime Minister after 10 years at the helm, lost by 400,000 votes to the Mayor of Lisbon, Jorge Sampaio.

The other left candidates, Jerónimo de Sousa and Alberto Matos, presented by the Portuguese Communist Party and the People's Democratic Union respectively, both left the race one week before the elections, announcing their support for Jorge Sampaio, as the victory of a left-wing candidate was in doubt. These parties had already supported Sampaio in a coalition that won the local elections in Lisbon. It would be the last time that People's Democratic Union presented a candidate, as two years later it merged with other small left-wing parties and formed the Left Bloc.

Cavaco Silva was supported by the two major right-wing parties, the Social Democratic Party and the People's Party, and once more, the right-wing parties did not manage to win the presidential election. The election was, therefore, a rematch between Jorge Sampaio and Cavaco Silva as in the 1991 general election, Cavaco Silva defeated Jorge Sampaio by a 51% to 29% margin.

Sampaio gathered the majority of the votes in all the districts in the South of Portugal, including the Communist strongholds in Alentejo and Setúbal district. Cavaco won in the more conservative districts of the North (excluding Porto district, where Sampaio edged out Cavaco by a narrow 52% to 48% margin) and also in Leiria district, traditional strongholds of the right-wing parties.

With only two candidates left on the race, no second round was needed, and Sampaio was inaugurated to his first term in office on 9 March 1996.

Aníbal Cavaco Silva would have to wait ten more years to be elected president in 2006.

Procedure
Any Portuguese citizen over 35 years old has the opportunity to run for president. In order to do so it is necessary to gather between 7500 and 15000 signatures and submit them to the Portuguese Constitutional Court.

According to the Portuguese Constitution, to be elected, a candidate needs a majority of votes. If no candidate gets this majority there will take place a second round between the two most voted candidates.

Candidates
Jorge Sampaio, Mayor of Lisbon between 1989 and 1995, leader of the Socialist Party between 1989 and 1992, supported by the Socialist Party;
Aníbal Cavaco Silva, Prime Minister between 1985 and 1995, leader of the Social Democratic Party between 1985 and 1995, supported by the Social Democratic Party and the People's Party;
Jerónimo de Sousa, Official candidate of the Portuguese Communist Party and Ecologist Party "The Greens", Left the race to support Jorge Sampaio;
Alberto Matos, Official candidate of the People's Democratic Union, Left the race to support Jorge Sampaio;

Campaign period

Party slogans

Candidates' debates

Opinion polls
Note, until 2000, the publication of opinion polls in the last week of the campaign was forbidden.

Results

Summary of the 14 January 1996 Portuguese presidential election results
|-
!style="background-color:#E9E9E9;text-align:left;" colspan="2" rowspan="2"|Candidates 
!style="background-color:#E9E9E9;text-align:left;" rowspan="2"|Supporting parties 	
!style="background-color:#E9E9E9;text-align:right;" colspan="2"|First round
|-
!style="background-color:#E9E9E9;text-align:right;"|Votes
!style="background-color:#E9E9E9;text-align:right;"|%
|-
|style="width:10px;background-color:#FF66FF;text-align:center;"|
|style="text-align:left;"|Jorge Sampaio
|style="text-align:left;"|Socialist Party
|style="text-align:right;"|3,035,056
|style="text-align:right;"|53.91
|-
|style="width: 5px" style="background-color:#FF9900;text-align:center;"| 
|style="text-align:left;"|Aníbal Cavaco Silva 
|style="text-align:left;"|Social Democratic Party, People's Party
|style="text-align:right;"|2,595,131
|style="text-align:right;"|46.09
|-
|style="width: 5px" style="background-color:red;text-align:center;"| 
|style="text-align:left;"|Jerónimo de Sousa
|style="text-align:left;"|Portuguese Communist Party, Ecologist Party "The Greens"
|colspan="2" style="text-align:center;" |left the race
|-
|style="width: 5px" style="background-color:#E2062C;text-align:center;"| 
|style="text-align:left;"|Alberto Matos
|style="text-align:left;"|People's Democratic Union
|colspan="2" style="text-align:center;" |left the race
|-
|colspan="3" style="text-align:left;background-color:#E9E9E9"|Total valid
|width="65" style="text-align:right;background-color:#E9E9E9"|5,630,187
|width="40" style="text-align:right;background-color:#E9E9E9"|100.00
|-
|style="text-align:right;" colspan="3"|Blank ballots
|width="65" style="text-align:right;"|69,328
|width="40" style="text-align:right;"|1.20
|-
|style="text-align:right;" colspan="3" |Invalid ballots
|width="65" style="text-align:right;"|63,463
|width="40" style="text-align:right;"|1.10
|-
|colspan="3" style="text-align:left;background-color:#E9E9E9"|Total
|width="65" style="text-align:right;background-color:#E9E9E9"|5,762,978
|width="40" style="text-align:right;background-color:#E9E9E9"|
|-
|colspan=3|Registered voters/turnout
||8,693,636||66.29
|-
| colspan=5 style="text-align:left;"|Both candidates left the race in favour of Jorge Sampaio.
|-
|colspan=5 style="text-align:left;"|Source: Comissão Nacional de Eleições 
|}

Maps

Notes

References

External links
Portuguese Electoral Commission
 NSD: European Election Database - Portugal publishes regional level election data; allows for comparisons of election results, 1990-2010

See also
 President of Portugal
 Portugal
 Politics of Portugal

1996 elections in Portugal
1996
January 1996 events in Europe